Longbridge Weir Hydro Power House is the name given to a hydro-electric dam built on the River Derwent in the City of Derby.

The project was completed by Derwent Hydro in 2013 at a cost of £1.7 million. The station primarily exists to power the city councils offices, however, surplus energy is sold back to the National Grid.

References 

Buildings and structures in Derby
Hydroelectric power stations in England
River Derwent, Derbyshire